Øre is a former municipality in Møre og Romsdal county, Norway. The municipality existed from 1838 until its dissolution in 1965 when it was merged into Gjemnes Municipality. The  municipality was located south and west of the Batnfjorden, to the northeast of the town of Molde. The administrative centre was the village of Øre.

History
The municipality of Øre was established on 1 January 1838 (see formannskapsdistrikt law).  On 1 September 1882, a part of the neighboring Fredø Municipality (population: 40) was transferred to Øre. On 1 September 1893, the northern part of Øre (population: 226), was separated from Øre and merged with parts of Fredø and Kvernes municipalities to form the newly created Gjemnes Municipality.

During the 1960s, there were many municipal mergers across Norway due to the work of the Schei Committee. On 1 January 1965, the municipality of Øre ceased to exist.  Øre Municipality (population: 1,565) was merged with Gjemnes Municipality (population: 697) and all of Tingvoll Municipality that was located west of the Tingvollfjorden (population: 778).

Government
All municipalities in Norway, including Øre, are responsible for primary education (through 10th grade), outpatient health services, senior citizen services, unemployment and other social services, zoning, economic development, and municipal roads.  The municipality is governed by a municipal council of elected representatives, which in turn elects a mayor.

Municipal council
The municipal council  of Øre was made up of 19 representatives that were elected to four year terms.  The party breakdown of the final municipal council was as follows:

See also
List of former municipalities of Norway

References

Gjemnes
Former municipalities of Norway
1838 establishments in Norway
1965 disestablishments in Norway